Umeshnagar railway station (station code: UMNR) is a railway station under the Sonpur railway division of East Central Railway. Umeshnagar station is located in Rahimpur Panchayat of Khagaria district in the Indian state of Bihar. There are three platforms and 14 halting trains at this station. The station is named after local freedom fighter and Congress politician Umeshwar Prasad.

References 

Railway stations in Khagaria district
Sonpur railway division